Burj Jeway Khan or Burj Jiwey Khan is a town and union council of Okara District in the Punjab province of Pakistan.

References

Union councils of Okara District